Big Creek Lake (or Converse Reservoir) is a municipal reservoir which serves as the main source of drinking water for the city of Mobile, Alabama and its suburbs. It was formed by the damming of Big Creek, a tributary of the Escatawpa River in southwest Alabama. The reservoir was the subject of controversy in the 1980s over freshwater rights between Alabama and Mississippi.

Geography
The reservoir’s watershed covers 103 square miles (267 km²) and lies totally within Mobile County.

History
During the period from 1907 to 1940, the city of Mobile kept pace with providing water service for the population growth until the outbreak of World War II when it became increasingly apparent that the existing sources of supply were inadequate and undependable. A new source was necessary not only because of lack of sufficient quantity, but because the water sheds of Clear and Three Mile Creeks were becoming more urbanized and the quality of the supply was endangered. The source of supply recommended by the Mobile Water Works to the City and Planning Commissions was Big Creek, in the western part of Mobile County. The Big Creek project was placed in service in 1952 at a cost of about $7,000,000 including land, dams, pumphouse, reservoir and pipelines. Construction required two years.

The Big Creek impoundment was named J. B. Converse Reservoir in 1987, but is commonly referred to as "Big Creek Lake". The pumping station was named S. Palmer Gaillard Pumping Station.

Water is delivered from the  lake and pumping station by pipes to two reservoirs where it is diverted either to domestic or industrial use. The reservoirs are at an elevation of 220 ft (67 m) and industrial water is delivered by gravity to industry at an elevation of about 25 ft (8 m). The industrial water line extends from the filter plant northward about 7 mi (11 km) to the industrial sites at Magazine Point. Pumps at Big Creek Lake provide treated water to Mobile and untreated water to local industries such as chemical plants and paper mills.

Controversy
The Big Creek tributary, like the Escatawpa, originates in Alabama and flows into Mississippi, joining the Escatawpa about nine miles (14 km) northeast of Robertson Lake. Big Creek Lake was a source of controversy regarding the equitable apportionment of limited fresh water resources between the states of Mississippi and Alabama in the early eighties. The City of Mobile utilizes waters from Big Creek Lake for their municipal drinking water supply, decreasing available flow for downstream uses in Mississippi.

See also
List of lakes in Alabama
List of rivers in Alabama
Mobile County, Alabama

References

External links
City of Mobile, Alabama
Mobile Area Water & Sewer System

Bodies of water of Mobile County, Alabama
Reservoirs in Alabama